Athabasca Falls is a waterfall in Jasper National Park on the upper Athabasca River, approximately  south of the townsite of Jasper, Alberta, Canada, and just west of the Icefields Parkway.

Geography and geology 
A powerful, picturesque waterfall, Athabasca Falls is not known so much for its height as for its force, due to the large quantity of water falling into the gorge, which can be substantial even on a cold morning in the fall, when river levels tend to be at their lowest. The river falls over a layer of hard quartzite and through the softer limestone below, carving a short gorge and a number of potholes.

Access 
The falls can be safely viewed and photographed from various viewing platforms and walking trails around the falls. Access is from the nearby parking lot, which leads off Highway 93A just northeast of the falls. Highway 93A takes off from the nearby Icefields Parkway, and crosses the falls on the way north to the town of Jasper. Whitewater rafting often starts below the falls to travel downstream on the Athabasca River to Jasper.

Photo gallery

See also
List of waterfalls of Canada

References

External links

Explore Jasper. Athabasca Falls

Jasper National Park
Waterfalls of Alberta